Kuridere is a village in the municipality of Gradsko, North Macedonia.

Demographics
According to Vasil Kanchov's statistics ("Macedonia. Ethnography and Statistics") from 1900, Kuru Dere had 312 inhabitants, all Turks.

On his 1927 ethnic map of Leonhard Schulze-Jena, the village is written as Kurudere and as a fully Turkish village.

The settlement last had inhabitants in the 1981 census, where it was recorded as being populated by 1 Albanian.

According to the 2002 census, the village had 0 inhabitants.

References

Villages in Gradsko Municipality
Albanian communities in North Macedonia